Anne Liardet (born April 16, 1961 in Bourges) is a French female offshore professional sailor.

Biography
Her father is a teacher who moved to teach at Brest Graduate School of Arts when she was one year old. The family moved to Sainte-Anne-du-Portzic she was introduced to sailing by her father. After leaving school she started work for a sailmaker but within two years she moved into working in a boatyards preparation ocean racing boats. Working in the world of offshore racing at a shipyard and then on various sailing yacht she already imagines herself aboard the boats she prepares. She is the mother of three children Morgan, Manon and Margot, whom she had with partner and fellow offshore sailor Jo Le Guen where they live in Daoulas, Finistère.

Sailing career
She is the third woman to finish a Vendée Globe solo yacht race following Catherine Chabaud in 1997 and Ellen MacArthur in 2001. She attempted to return to professional sailing to compete in the 2012-2013 Vendee Globe but failed to raise the funds. In 2021 she returned to offshore sailing mounting a Mini Transat campaign.

Results highlights

References

External links
 
 

1961 births
Living people
French female sailors (sport)
IMOCA 60 class sailors
French Vendee Globe sailors
2004 Vendee Globe sailors
Vendée Globe finishers
Sportspeople from Bourges